"Might Be Right" is a single by American rock band White Reaper. The single is the lead single from their third studio album, You Deserve Love. It was released on May 27, 2019, through Elektra Records.

"Might Be Right" was the first single by the band to chart and reached number one on the Billboard Alternative Songs chart for the week ending February 15, 2020.

Music video 
The music video for "Might Be Right" came out on May 27, 2019. The music video was directed by Daniel Ryan and produced by Jonah Mueller. The video shows the band playing in a room with a neon sign saying the band's initials "WR" in the background.

Charts

Weekly charts

Year-end charts

References

2019 songs
2019 singles
White Reaper songs
Elektra Records singles